The AHA Foundation is a nonprofit organization for the defense of women's rights.  It was founded by Ayaan Hirsi Ali in 2007 and is based in New York City. Originally formed to support Muslim dissidents who had suffered for their religious or political beliefs, the organization's scope was broadened September 2008 to focus on women's rights. The goal of the AHA Foundation is to combat crimes against women and girls such as child marriage, forced marriages, female genital mutilation and honor killings. Its key activities include education, outreach and legislative advocacy.

According to its mission statement, "The AHA Foundation is a 501(c)(3) nonprofit that believes in liberty for all. That means liberty from female genital mutilation, honor violence and forced marriages. And it means liberty to challenge the ideology of Islamism - extremism that threatens Western civilization - with rational, Enlightenment thought."

Areas of concern

Forced marriages
"A forced marriage occurs when an individual is forced, coerced, threatened, or tricked to marry without her informed consent. A forced marriage is different from an arranged marriage. In many cultures, it is customary for families to arrange meetings between their children in the hopes of fostering a voluntary relationship that will lead to a marriage. In such situations, while the initial meetings are arranged by the families and a marriage is encouraged, the ultimate decision regarding whether to marry remains with the couple and the choice to marry is strictly voluntary. In contrast, in a forced marriage, an individual is threatened and/or coerced by her family to enter into the marriage against her will and may suffer honor violence or if she resists or refuses the marriage."

United States
"Estimates are that hundreds of Pakistani girls in New York have been flown out of the New York City area to Pakistan to undergo forced marriages; those who resist are threatened and coerced." The Tahirih Justice Center released survey results in September 2011 that found as many as 3,000 known or suspected cases of forced marriage within immigrant communities in the United States in the two years preceding the survey. The actual number of forced marriage cases in the United States may be much higher, as the survey was directed towards service providers and other professionals. Many more existing cases are likely hidden from the view of officials

"The U.S. Department of State Foreign Affairs Manual provides recommendations on what consular personnel can do when faced with a minor who contacts them, to prevent a forced marriage from taking place.  It is not known how often consular officials are faced with this issue, and it is not known what advice consular personnel provides U.S. citizens abroad who are faced with this issue. It is worth researching and publicly releasing information on how often U.S. consular personnel are approached with regard to this topic and what their course of action is, and how such cases are eventually resolved (or are not). The “best practices” of the British Foreign Office may be worth replicating to ensure that vulnerable girls can sound the alarm if need be, so authorities can intervene where necessary to help protect women from being flown out of the country to face forced marriages, and assist them abroad to return to the U.S. unharmed. From the information that is publicly available, British practices in this area seem more stringent and proactive than U.S. practices.

American courts (like British courts) should be able to offer “forced marriage protection orders” to protect girls and women who face a looming forced marriage. U.S. law enforcement officials, civil servants dealing with issues of women’s rights and education, and Congressional constituent offices should receive statutory guidelines (as in the U.K.) on what to do when a person contacts them who is facing a forced marriage.

At the institutional level, existing U.S. child welfare, domestic violence and human trafficking institutions are currently not equipped to protect forced marriage victims or to address their unique needs. Most domestic violence shelters will not accommodate minors, and few service providers are trained or funded to address the issue of forced marriage. In several states, child welfare officials declared that the intended child-brides were not at risk of imminent harm and sent them home, where the girls’ parents promptly severed all contact with advocates and sent the girls to the altar.  These resources should be strengthened at the local level, and in dialogue with agencies at the State and Federal level dealing with domestic violence issues."

United Kingdom
The British government has set up a Forced Marriage Unit, and increased police awareness of forced marriages and honor-related violence. The FMU has a confidential helpline and is the UK’s "one-stop shop" for government policy on forced marriage, coordinating outreach projects and providing support and information to those at risk.

Forced-marriage protection orders (possible under British law) offer help to people who face the prospect of being forced into marriage, either inside or outside the UK; an order can be drawn up immediately in an emergency to protect and prevent a forced marriage.  Violators can be punished with up to two years in prison.  The British government has worked through the Foreign and Commonwealth Office (the equivalent of the U.S. State Department) and the British police (backed by legislation, where appropriate) to deter and punish perpetrators and open avenues of escape for victims (and potential victims) of violence.

The British government has provided detailed guidelines to members of Parliament and constituent offices, civil servants, health professionals and others on how to deal with forced marriages in an effort to raise awareness and efficiently disseminate best practices. Detailed statutory guidance has been provided to department heads of relevant agencies and government employees who may confront a case of forced marriage in the course of carrying out their official duties.

Netherlands
A study in prevention is the city of Rotterdam’s school-attendance monitoring system to ensure that Muslim girls are not withdrawn from school and forced into an arranged marriage during summer break. If a girl faces a looming forced marriage she can (if she wishes) file a declaration with her school, and the school must notify police if she does not return after summer break; a forced stay abroad can be fought legally with such a declaration. Teachers are also being trained to recognize signs of possible forced marriage. As of September 2009, in Rotterdam three young women signed such a contract. The municipality of Rotterdam and the GGD maintain regular contact with these girls. As a result, the girls were not forced to marry in the summer of 2009.

Germany
German teachers will receive guidelines on handling the issue of forced marriages with their pupils, the German government announced in June 2010 (following a number of cases). The guidelines aim to give schools and teachers concrete tips for detecting warning signs if a student is being pushed into a forced marriage, and on talking to parents and alerting child-protection services.

Sweden
The Swedish government announced in May 2010 the launch of an inquiry aimed at tightening legislation banning forced and child marriages, which it identified as a continuing problem.

Honor violence and killings

Honor violence is intended to be corrective. If the girl complies, normally punishment ceases. If not, honor violence sometimes ends in murder—such as the 2009 murder of 20-year-old Iraqi-American Noor Almaleki in Arizona and the 2008 honor killings of Sarah and Aminah Said in Lewisville, Texas—carried out with the knowledge (and help) of family members and other relatives. When the corrective beatings fail to dissuade a girl or woman from complying with the wishes of her family (or giving up behavior they consider shameful), the family may conclude that the only way they can regain "honor" lost through the girl's "shameful" behavior is to kill her.

United States
American authorities currently do not track cases of honor violence. Most law-enforcement officials, educators, guidance counselors and social workers are not familiar with honor violence and on the circumstances that make honor-related crimes different from other types of domestic violence. As federal officials track the incidence of domestic violence, they should track incidents of honor-related violence. Pilot projects could be established in large metropolitan areas (such as New York) to screen criminal cases (including murder cases of girls and women from honor-related cultures, such as Pakistani, Afghan, Kurdish women) for honor-related motives. Federal offices dealing with domestic violence can become aware through researching specific challenges facing women from Islamic and honor-based cultures, and convey this information to cities and areas where larger populations from honor-based cultures live.

According to the Foundation, U.S. government officials should do a better job of selecting outreach partners and liaisons to the American Muslim community. Many Muslim outreach partners whom U.S. government officials select for dialogue and liaison are religiously orthodox; these orthodox Muslims tell U.S. government officials that secular (and feminist) American Muslims are not representative of the American Muslim community, leading U.S. government officials not to include them in dialogue.  Moderate, secular and feminist Muslims have been disempowered in the United States; the British government has made a similar error in its choice of “representative Muslims”.  Unwise choices of dialogue partners ensure that issues such as honor killings, domestic violence, forced marriages and FGM are not prominent on the agenda.
By selecting better dialogue partners (and then seeking their advice and input) U.S. government officials can empower moderate, secular and feminist Muslims, giving them the voice they need to raise these issues in a constructive manner.

The Netherlands
In a pilot project carried out by Dutch police between October 2004 and March 2006, many more incidents of honor-related crimes (79) were uncovered than had been expected when police screened cases specifically for the presence of “honor” motives and flagged them as such.  The figures (deemed “shocking” by government officials) led to more training of police officers, social workers and other officials to be alert for such crimes and act appropriately. In addition, the Dutch established the inter-agency Honor-Related Violence Task Force in 2006 to raise awareness and develop inter-agency intervention approaches. The task force focuses on issues of social prevention, protection and criminal prosecution. The Dutch government has set aside funds to help women who are (potential) victims of honor-related violence.

At the local level, Dutch cities such as Amsterdam are pressing ahead with initiatives to curb honor-related violence. Amsterdam has made cooperation agreements with non-governmental partners regarding a speedy and adequate approach in cases of imminent honor-related violence. Authorities work actively with NGOs with the goals of protecting (potential) victims and using the law to prevent escalation of honor violence to the death of innocent victims.

Female genital mutilation
Female genital mutilation (FGM) is the mutilation of a girl's clitoris (and often the labia)—usually from 3 to 13 years of age but sometimes earlier, or as late as before marriage or pregnancy. The World Health Organization (WHO) estimates that there are 100 to 140 million female genital mutilation victims (most from Africa) worldwide. The procedure can result in urinary problems, severe bleeding and complications during childbirth; it has no health benefits. FGM is usually performed for religious or cultural purposes.

United States
As of 2012 Federal law makes FGM illegal, but does not punish parents or relatives who take young girls out of the country to undergo it. A 2010 case in Georgia involved the removal of a nine-month-old girl's clitoris by her mother, who faces female-genital-mutilation and child cruelty charges and has lost custody to the baby girl's father. A bipartisan bill introduced in 2010, the “Girls Protection Act” (H.R. 5137) sponsored by Rep. Joseph Crowley (D-NY) and Mary Bono Mack (R-CA), would make it a federal crime to transport a minor outside the United States for the purpose of female genital mutilation. The Girls Protection Act would extend current federal law to ensure that the same penalties that exist for domestic FGM apply to those involved in the transport of a minor abroad for the purpose of FGM.

United Kingdom
Building upon (and replacing) the Prohibition of Female Circumcision Act 1985, the British Female Genital Mutilation Act of 2003 makes it illegal to perform FGM, take girls out of the country for the procedure, and increases the penalty of imprisonment to 14 years. As of 2009 there had been no cases of FGM prosecuted, and girls are subject to the procedure when they return with their families to their country of origin for the Christmas holidays.

Netherlands
The Netherlands has received a large influx of immigrants from countries practicing female genital mutilation—particularly from Somalia, which is known for its severe FGM practices. As a Member of Parliament in the Netherlands, Ayaan Hirsi Ali unsuccessfully campaigned to create a control system for girls from at-risk communities by requiring pediatricians and other pediatric medical professionals to screen them for FGM.

Norway
The Norwegian Action Plan to combat FGM for residents and immigrants was initiated in 2000. The present plan focuses on prevention, public awareness and required reporting of likely (or completed) FGM by public employees to the Municipal Child Welfare Service (MCWS).  The plan has assigned metrics to measure success, including targeted prevention activities for the holiday season and prosecution of offenders.

References

External links
 

Charities based in New York City
Women's rights organizations